New Progressive Party may refer to:

 New Progressive Party (Japan)
 New Progressive Party (Puerto Rico)
 New Progressive Party (South Korea), a left-wing political party in South Korea

See also
Progressive Party (disambiguation)
List of political parties by name